The 1972 Connecticut Huskies football team represented the University of Connecticut in the 1972 NCAA College Division football season.  The Huskies were led by second year head coach Robert Casciola, and completed the season with a record of 4–5.

Schedule

Roster

References

Connecticut
UConn Huskies football seasons
Connecticut Huskies football